Kitsune is used in English to refer to fox spirits in Japanese folklore.

Kitsune may also refer to:

Companies and organizations 
 Maison Kitsuné, a French-Japanese fashion brand and record label

Myth and fiction  
 Kuda-gitsune, a creature supposedly employed by Japanese kitsune-tsukai
 Kitsune (Time Hunter), the fourth in the series of Time Hunter novellas in the Doctor Who franchise
 Kitsune (Usagi Yojimbo), a fictional character in the comic book series Usagi Yojimbo
 Mitsune "Kitsune" Konno, a fictional character in the anime and manga series Love Hina
 Kitsune, a fictional character in the IDW Publishing comic book series Teenage Mutant Ninja Turtles

Music 
 Kitsuné Musique, a French-Japanese record label
 Kitsune (EP), a 2012 EP by Marriages

Other uses 
 Kitsune's wedding, a Japanese folkloric term for a sunshower
 Kitsune bakuchi, a dice game from Japan
 Kitsune Kon, an annual anime convention in Green Bay, United States
 Kitsune udon, a type of udon topped with aburaage (sweetened deep-fried tofu pockets) popular in the Kansai region, particularly Osaka